An organ pipe, or a harpsichord string, designated as eight-foot pitch (8′) is sounded at standard, ordinary pitch. For example, the A above middle C in eight-foot pitch would be sounded at 440 Hz (or at some similar value, depending on how concert pitch was set at the time and place the organ or harpsichord was made).

Similar terms

Eight-foot pitch may be contrasted with four-foot pitch (4′; one octave above the standard), two-foot pitch (2′; two octaves above the standard), and sixteen-foot pitch (16′; one octave below the standard). The latter three pitches are often sounded (by extra pipes or strings) along with an eight-foot pitch pipe or string, as a way of enriching the tonal quality.  The numbers just mentioned largely exhaust the possibilities for harpsichords, but in organs a far greater variety is possible; see Organ stop.

These lengths can all be obtained by successive doubling because, all else being equal, a pipe or string that is double the length of another will vibrate at a pitch one octave lower.

Choice of length
The particular length "eight feet" is based on the approximate length of an organ pipe sounding the pitch two octaves below middle C, the bottom note on an organ keyboard. This may be calculated as follows.

If a pipe is open at both ends, as is true of most organ pipes, its fundamental frequency f can be calculated (approximately) as follows:

,

where

f = fundamental frequency
v = the speed of sound
l = the length of the pipe

If v is assumed to be 343 m/s (the speed of sound at sea level, with temperature of 20 °C, and the pipe length l is assumed to be eight feet (2.44 m), then the formula yields the value of 70.4 hertz (Hz; cycles per second). This is not far from the pitch of the C two octaves below 440 Hz, which (when concert pitch is set at A = 440 Hz) is 65.4 Hz. The discrepancy may be related to various factors, including effects of pipe diameter, the historical differing definitions of the length of the foot, and variations in tuning prior to the setting of A = 440 Hz as the standard pitch in the 20th century.

See also

References

Harpsichord
Pipe organ